Swepson is a surname. Notable people with the surname include:

 George William Swepson (1819–1883), American carpetbagger and swindler
 Jason Swepson, American football coach and former player
 Mitchell Swepson (born 1993), Australian cricketer